Phillip Mitchell Landrum (September 10, 1907 – November 19, 1990) was a Democratic U.S. Representative from Georgia.

Born in Martin, Georgia, Landrum attended the public schools and Mercer University, in Macon, Georgia.
He graduated from Piedmont College, in Demorest, Georgia (A.B., 1939) and from the Atlanta Law School (LL.B., 1941).
While in college and law school, Landrum worked as Superintendent of Nelson (Georgia) High School (1937–1941). He was admitted to the bar in 1941 and commenced the practice of law in Canton, Georgia.

He was an unsuccessful candidate for Congress in 1942. During the Second World War, Landrum enlisted as a private in the United States Army Air Corps on October 2, 1942. He served in Europe and was discharged on June 1, 1945, as a first lieutenant.

After his discharge from the military, Landrum was briefly employed by the Veterans' Administration. He then served as assistant attorney general of the State of Georgia in 1946-1947, and as Executive secretary to Governor Melvin E. Thompson in 1947-1948.

He returned to the practice of law in Jasper, Georgia until he was elected as a Democrat to the Eighty-third and to the eleven succeeding Congresses (January 3, 1953 – January 3, 1977). While he easily won twelve general elections, he faced strong opposition in several primary elections, including from a young Zell Miller in 1964 and 1966.

Landrum was one of the primary sponsors of the Labor Management Reporting and Disclosure Act, also known as the Landrum-Griffin Act. He was also the author of the Economic Opportunity Act of 1964, one of the key pieces of legislation of President Lyndon Johnson's War on Poverty.

A staunch segregationist, in 1956, Landrum signed "The Southern Manifesto."

He was not a candidate for re-election in 1976. He was a resident of Jasper until his death on November 19, 1990.

Interstate 575 is named in his honor.

Notes

References

New York Times obituary
OurCampaigns.com

1907 births
1990 deaths
People from Stephens County, Georgia
Democratic Party members of the United States House of Representatives from Georgia (U.S. state)
United States Army Air Forces officers
United States Army Air Forces personnel of World War II
People from Canton, Georgia
People from Franklin County, Georgia
People from Macon, Georgia
People from Jasper, Georgia
20th-century American politicians
American segregationists